Low base effect in business and economics is the tendency of a small absolute change from a low initial amount to be translated into a large percentage change.

In the following example, focusing solely on the 33.3% growth of Company B in year 5 may give a misleading indication of the company's relative performance versus Company A.

References

Economics effects
Socio-economic statistics